Hüttwilersee is a lake in the Canton of Thurgau, Switzerland. It is located near two other lakes, Nussbaumersee and Hasensee, on the border of the municipalities of Hüttwilen und Uesslingen-Buch.

See also
List of lakes of Switzerland

External links 
 Stiftung Seebachtal 

Lakes of Thurgau
Lakes of Switzerland
LHuttwilersee